Forever Amber (1944) is an historical romance novel by Kathleen Winsor set in 17th-century England. It was made into a film in 1947 by 20th Century Fox.

Forever Amber tells the story of an orphaned Amber St. Clare, who makes her way up through the ranks of 17th-century English society by sleeping with or marrying successively richer and more important men while keeping her love for the one man she can never have. The subplot of the novel follows Charles II of England as he returns from exile and adjusts to ruling England. The novel includes portrayals of Restoration fashion, including the introduction and popularization of tea in English coffeehouses and the homes of the fashionably rich; politics; and public disasters, including the plague and the Great Fire of London. Many notable historical figures appear in the book, including Charles II of England, members of his court, and several of his mistresses including Nell Gwyn.

Winsor's inspiration for the book came from her first husband, who had written his undergraduate thesis on Charles II, completed while he was serving in the army. She read books on the period and wrote numerous drafts of what would become Forever Amber.

Plot
Judith Marsh has been engaged since birth to her neighbor, John Mainwaring, heir to the Earl of Rosswood. In 1644, she has her engagement broken off when her family and the Mainwarings find themselves on opposing sides of the English Civil War. During a break in the fighting, John visits Judith and the two consummate their relationship. Pregnant, Judith abandons her family and goes to Parliamentarian territory on John's instructions, introducing herself as Judith St. Clare. There, she ends up staying with farmer Matthew Goodegroome and his wife Sarah. Judith dies in childbirth after naming her daughter Amber (after the color of John's eyes).

In 1660, Amber, now a flirtatious teenager, is being raised by the Goodegroomes in ignorance of her origins. She meets a band of Royalists who inform her that Charles II of England is returning. Amber is particularly attracted to Lord Bruce Carlton. During a fair, she lures him into the woods and loses her virginity to him. After she persuades him, Carlton reluctantly takes her to London, but tells Amber he will not marry her and she will come to regret her choice.

In London, Carlton makes Amber his mistress. She quickly grows accustomed to their luxurious lifestyle. She longs to marry Carlton and believes becoming pregnant will make him marry her. However, when she does become pregnant, Carlton announces plans to become a privateer. He leaves Amber a significant amount of money and tells her if she is clever she can legitimize herself and her child by marrying well. Left alone, Amber is befriended by a woman named Sally Goodman and passes herself off as a rich country heiress. Sally introduces Amber to her nephew Luke Channell, who Amber quickly marries out of fear that her pregnancy will soon be visible. She soon discovers Sally and Luke are not who they appear. When they realize she is not as wealthy as she claimed they abandon her, leaving her penniless. Amber is pursued by creditors and taken to a debtors' prison. Salvation comes when she catches the eye of Black Jack Mallard, a highwayman who takes Amber with him when he escapes. Black Jack takes Amber to Whitefriars, where she is introduced to the ways of criminals and gives birth to a son who she gives to a countrywoman to raise properly. Black Jack hires a student of noble birth, Michael Godfrey, to educate Amber, and begins to use her as bait in schemes where she lures handsome, rich men to quiet corners before Black Jack robs them.

Amber attracts the attention of Bess, Black Jack's former lover, whose jealous behavior towards Amber results in Bess being kicked out. Bess avenges herself by turning in Black Jack and his conspirators. Amber manages to escape and happens upon Michael, who offers her his protection. She becomes his mistress.

Terrified that her debts will one day catch up with her, Amber learns that actors are protected from arrest (through being servants of the King) and uses her connections to find a position with the King's Company. Though she is not a great actress, Amber uses her beauty to earn larger parts, hoping to attract the attention of a man who can afford to keep her as his mistress. She catches the eye of Captain Rex Morgan, the paramour of fellow actress Beck Marshall, and succeeds in persuading him to pay to keep her. Morgan falls in love with Amber and offers to marry her, but she resists, wanting a wealthier husband. Amber eventually attracts the attention of the King and sleeps with him twice before his mistress, Barbara Palmer, intervenes. Depressed, Amber decides to marry Rex, but Bruce returns from his travels, and Amber realizes she is still in love with him. This leads to a duel between Bruce and Rex, resulting in Rex dying and Bruce leaving once more.

Now bereft Amber falls deeper into prostitution. Shunned and unwell following an abortion, she flees to Tunbridge Wells where she meets a rich elderly widower, Samuel Dangerfield, and seduces him into marriage by pretending to be a modest young widow. Dangerfield's puritanical family is horrified, though she becomes friends with his daughter Jemima, who is only a few years younger than herself. Amber discovers her new husband is financing Bruce, and re-starts her affair with him, hoping to conceive a child she can pass off as her husband's. Amber becomes pregnant then discovers her stepdaughter is also pregnant by Bruce, who abandons both of them. Amber finds a suitable husband for Jemima and is left extremely wealthy after Samuel dies. Shortly after their child is born Bruce returns, and both he and Amber contract plague. They both survive but Bruce abandons her again, and Amber decides to marry for a third time, to the avaricious but influential Earl of Radclyffe.

Now a countess, Amber intends to go to court and become the King's favored mistress, replacing Barbara Palmer. Her husband interferes in these plans and forces her to move to the country. As revenge, Amber seduces her new husband's son and is discovered. Her husband attempts to poison the pair, succeeding in killing his son. The Earl then flees to London, where Amber has him killed (using the Great Fire of London to cover up the crime).

Finally free, she becomes the King's mistress and becomes pregnant by him. The King arranges a marriage – Amber's fourth – to Gerald Stanhope. Bruce returns, and Amber continues cheating on her husband with both the King and Bruce. Bruce reveals that he is married and intends to make their son his lawful heir, to which Amber reluctantly consents, knowing it will secure his future. Amber becomes the King's primary and official mistress, and he makes her Duchess of Ravenspur. As Amber is at the height of her power and influence, Bruce returns once again and resumes his affair with Amber. Bruce's wife Corinna discovers the affair and Bruce finally leaves Amber for good. Amber confronts Corinna, revealing that she is the mother of Bruce's son.  While the two are quarreling, Bruce returns and he and Amber get into a violent fight, broken up by Corinna.
 
Unbeknownst to Amber, the Duke of Buckingham (one of the influential men to which Amber prostituted herself) decides Amber is a threat and makes a plan with a former enemy, Lord Arlington, to get rid of her. The two men write Amber a note claiming Corinna has died. A hopeful Amber leaves England in pursuit of Bruce, hoping he will finally marry her, unaware that Corinna is alive and well.

Characters

Original characters
Amber St. Clare – The illegitimate daughter of two nobles who is raised by well-off farmers ignorant of her origins. She is extremely beautiful and ambitious but also selfish and naive.
 Lord Bruce Carlton – A free-spirited Royalist, thirteen years older than Amber, who spent his formative years in exile following Charles II of England's wandering court. 
Lord Almsbury – a friend of Bruce Carlton's who is also taken with Amber. He tries repeatedly over the years to make Amber his mistress. He is more willing to stay at home and play politics to secure his fortune, unlike his free-spirited friend. 
Nan Britton – Amber's loyal maid and an only female friend.
Black Jack Mallard – an extremely tall, clever, and lustful highwayman who uses his savvy to escape from debtors' prison.
Michael Godfrey – a bon vivant law student who falls in love with Amber and introduces her to a life of hedonism.
Captain Rex Morgan – a swashbuckling lothario who keeps many mistresses but is most interested and loyal to Amber, wanting to marry her despite knowing that she is married and has a child by another man.
Samuel Dangerfield – a 60-year-old widower and one of the richest men in England, this self-made man becomes Amber's second husband.
Earl of Radclyffe – Amber's ugly and indebted third husband is both impotent and abusive. Unbeknownst to Amber he was once engaged to marry her mother, Judith, before she ran away, leading him to pine after her for the rest of his life.
Gerald Stanhope – Amber's fourth husband who is the foppish first son of a family that went bankrupt during the civil war. He allows Amber to dominate him, and eventually allows her to pay him off so that she may live freely while he consorts with his mistress.
 Bruce – Amber and Bruce Carlton's oldest son, born of the first period of their long affair. 
Susanna Dangerfield – Amber and Bruce's youngest child, born during their affair during Amber's marriage to Samuel Dangerfield and passed off as a Dangerfield child. She is very much like her mother in both looks and temperament. 
Charles Stanhope – Amber's third child born of her affair with Charles II, King of England. He looks very much like his biological father, though Amber names him after Gerald Stanhope, her husband at the time of his birth. Amber uses his birth to manipulate the king into making her a countess and, eventually, a duchess.

Historical figures
 Charles II of England – The newly returned King of England who is well known for his voracious sexual appetite, good-temper, and political savvy. 
 Barbara Palmer, 1st Duchess of Cleveland – The king's favorite mistress who is an ill-tempered but extremely beautiful woman who is ambitious and enjoys scheming.
George Villiers, 2nd Duke of Buckingham – A perverse man who enjoys scheming and making enemies of his friends. He is Barbara Palmer's cousin.
Frances Stewart, Duchess of Richmond – a beautiful young noblewoman who attracts the King's attention but refuses to become his mistress.
Catherine of Braganza – Charles' Portuguese wife. Small of stature and very modest due to her Catholic upbringing, she is devoted to her husband and puts up with his affairs. He remains loyal to her as well, despite her inability to produce an heir.

Publication
After five drafts, Forever Amber was accepted for publication.  After editing, the two and a half million-word manuscript was reduced to a fifth of its original size. The published novel was 972 pages long.  A condensed version was published as an Armed Services Edition during WWII.

Critical reception
While many reviewers "praised the story for its relevance, comparing Amber's fortitude during the plague and fire to that of the women who held hearth and home together through the blitzes of World War II", others condemned it for its blatant sexual references. Fourteen US states banned the book as pornography. The first was Massachusetts, whose attorney general cited 70 references to sexual intercourse, 39 illegitimate pregnancies, 7 abortions, and "10 descriptions of women undressing in front of men" as reasons for banning the novel. Winsor denied that her book was particularly daring and said that she had no interest in explicit scenes. "I wrote only two sexy passages," she remarked, "and my publishers took both of them out. They put in ellipses instead. In those days, you know, you could solve everything with an ellipsis."

Despite its banning, Forever Amber was the best-selling US novel of the 1940s. It sold over 100,000 copies in its first week of release, and went on to sell over three million copies. Forever Amber was also responsible for popularizing "Amber" as a given name for girls in the 20th century.

The novel was quite popular with the personnel of the USS Astoria in the Second World War, with a copy circulating through the crew.

The book was condemned by the Catholic Church for indecency, which helped its popularity. One critic went so far as to number each of the passages to which he objected. A film adaptation by 20th Century Fox was finally completed after substantial changes to the script were made, toning down some of the book's most objectionable passages in order to appease Catholic media critics.

The book was banned in August 1945 in Australia. The Minister for Customs, Senator Richard Keane, said "The Almighty did not give people eyes to read that rubbish."

Cultural references

 Amber St. Clair appears as a historical character in The League of Extraordinary Gentlemen as a member of the first incarnation of the League in the 17th century, Prospero's Men.
Captain Beefheart references Forever Amber in the lyrics of the song "Pachuco Cadaver" on the album Trout Mask Replica.

References

External links
Guardian Unlimited book review of Forever Amber by Elaine Showalter, August 2002.

1944 American novels
American novels adapted into films
American historical novels
American romance novels
Novels set in the 1640s
Novels set in the 1660s
Novels set during the English Civil War
Novels set in London
Obscenity controversies in literature
Cultural depictions of Charles II of England
Cultural depictions of Barbara Palmer, 1st Duchess of Cleveland
Cultural depictions of Nell Gwyn
Cultural depictions of Catherine of Braganza

ja:永遠のアンバー